Bajali district was the district of the Indian state of Assam, carved out of Barpeta district. The Assam Cabinet headed by former Chief Minister Sarbananda Sonowal approved the proposal to make Bajali a full-fledged district  on 10 August 2020. On 12 January 2021 Bajali was formally declared as a district.

On 31 December 2022, the district was remerged with existing Barpeta district.

Bajali comprises parts of Bajali, Jalah and Sarupeta circles.

Demographics 

According to the 2011 census, Bajali district has a population of 253,876. Indigenous Scheduled Castes notably the Kaibarta-Jalkeot community and Scheduled Tribes notably the Boro community make up 19,192 (7.56%) and 11,486 (4.52%) of the population respectively. 189,075 of the population spoke Assamese, 53,052 Bengali, 10,877 Boro and 0.36% speaks other minority languages.

The district religious composition are as follows: Hindu 172,388, Muslim 81,003 and others at 485 as per 2011 census report.

References

Districts of Assam
Bajali district